Dionysius of Miletus was an ancient Greek ethnographer and historian. He may have lived in the 5th century BC and was a contemporary of Hecataeus of Miletus according to the Suda (a tenth century Byzantine encyclopedia).

Works
Dionysius is the alleged author of several works:
 Troica (in three books)
 History of Persia (Persica). Written in Ionic Greek.
 Description of the Inhabited World
 The Events after Darius (in five books)
 Historical Cycle (in seven books)

According to the Iranologist Rüdiger Schmitt, Dionysius was reportedly the author of a book about Persian history after the death of Darius the Great (522–486 BC). Schmitt adds: 

According to the modern historian Klaus Meister in the Oxford Classical Dictionary, except for the possible exception of the Persica and The Events after Darius (as they might be genuine), the actual historicity of Dionysius's works are contested. Meister adds:

References

Sources
 
 

Ancient Milesians
Ancient Greeks from the Achaemenid Empire
Historians from the Achaemenid Empire
5th-century BC Greek people
Ancient Greek historians
Ethnographers